Ricky Skaggs is an American country music and bluegrass singer, musician, producer and composer. He primarily plays mandolin; however, he also plays fiddle,  guitar, mandocaster and banjo.

Studio albums

1970s–1980s

1990s–2010s

Collaborative albums

Christmas albums

Live albums

Compilation albums

Singles

1970s–1980s

1990s–2010s

Other singles

Guest singles

Music videos

Notes

A^ Solid Ground also peaked at number 11 on the RPM Country Albums chart in Canada.
B^ Country Gentleman: The Best of Ricky Skaggs was re-released as The Essential Ricky Skaggs on March 15, 2011 via Legacy Recordings.

References

Skaggs, Ricky
Discographies of American artists